Lyrical Ballads, with a Few Other Poems is a collection of poems by William Wordsworth and Samuel Taylor Coleridge, first published in 1798 and generally considered to have marked the beginning of the English Romantic movement in literature. The immediate effect on critics was modest, but it became and remains a landmark, changing the course of English literature and poetry.

Most of the poems in the 1798 edition were written by Wordsworth, with Coleridge contributing only four poems to the collection (although these made about a third of the book in length), including one of his most famous works, The Rime of the Ancient Mariner.

A second edition was published in 1800, in which Wordsworth included additional poems and a preface detailing the pair's avowed poetical principles. For another edition, published in 1802, Wordsworth added an appendix titled Poetic Diction in which he expanded the ideas set forth in the preface. A third edition was published in 1802, with substantial additions made to its "Preface," and a fourth edition was published in 1805.

Content
Wordsworth and Coleridge set out to overturn what they considered the priggish, learned, and highly sculpted forms of 18th-century English poetry and to make poetry accessible to the average person via verse written in common, everyday language. These two major poets emphasise the vitality of the living voice used by the poor to express their reality. This language also helps assert the universality of human emotions. Even the title of the collection recalls rustic forms of art – the word "lyrical" links the poems with the ancient rustic bards and lends an air of spontaneity, while "ballads" are an oral mode of storytelling used by the common people.

In the 'Advertisement' included in the 1798 edition, Wordsworth explained his poetical concept:
The majority of the following poems are to be considered as experiments. They were written chiefly with a view to ascertain how far the language of conversation in the middle and lower classes of society is adapted to the purpose of poetic pleasure. 
If the experiment with vernacular language was not enough of a departure from the norm, the focus on simple, uneducated country people as the subject of poetry was a signal shift to modern literature.
One of the main themes of "Lyrical Ballads" is the return to the original state of nature, in which people led a purer and more innocent existence. Wordsworth subscribed to Rousseau's belief that humanity was essentially good but was corrupted by the influence of society. This may be linked with the sentiments spreading through Europe just prior to the French Revolution.

Poems in the first edition (1798)

Poems marked "(Coleridge)" were written by Coleridge; all the other poems were written by Wordsworth. In the first edition (1798) there were nineteen poems written by Wordsworth and four poems by Coleridge. 

The Rime of the Ancyent Marinere (Coleridge)
The Foster-Mother’s Tale (Coleridge)
Lines left upon a Seat in a Yew-tree which stands near the Lake of Esthwaite
The Nightingale, a Conversational Poem (Coleridge)
The Female Vagrant
Goody Blake and Harry Gill
Lines written at a small distance from my House, and sent by my little Boy to the Person to whom they are addressed
Simon Lee, the old Huntsman
Anecdote for Fathers
We are seven
Lines written in early spring
The Thorn
The last of the Flock
The Dungeon (Coleridge)
The Mad Mother
The Idiot Boy
Lines written near Richmond, upon the Thames, at Evening
Expostulation and Reply
The Tables turned; an Evening Scene, on the same subject
Old Man travelling
The Complaint of a forsaken Indian Woman
The Convict
Lines written a few miles above Tintern Abbey

Poems in the second edition (1800)

Poems marked "(Coleridge)" were written by Coleridge; all the other poems were written by Wordsworth.

Volume I

Expostulation and Reply
The Tables Turned; an Evening Scene, on the Same Subject
Old Man Travelling; Animal Tranquillity and Decay, a Sketch
The Complaint of a Forsaken Indian Woman
The Last of the Flock
Lines Left upon a Seat in a Yew-tree which Stands Near the Lake of Esthwaite
The Foster-Mother's Tale (Coleridge)
Goody Blake and Harry Gill
The Thorn
We are Seven
Anecdote for Fathers
Lines Written at a Small Distance from My House and Sent Me by My little Boy to the Person to whom They Are Addressed
The Female Vagrant
The Dungeon (Coleridge)
Simon Lee, the Old Huntsman
Lines Written in Early Spring
The Nightingale, written in April 1798. (Coleridge)
Lines Written When Sailing in a Boat at Evening
written Near Richmond, Upon the Thames
The Idiot Boy
The Mad Mother
The Rime of the Ancient Mariner (Coleridge)
Lines Written Above Tintern Abbey

Volume II

Hart-Leap Well
There Was a Boy, &c.
The Brothers, a Pastoral Poem
Ellen Irwin, or the Braes of Kirtle
Strange Fits of Passion Have I Known, &c.
Song
She Dwelt Among the Untrodden Ways
A Slumber Did My Spirit Seal, &c.
The Waterfall and the Eglantine
The Oak and the Broom, a Pastoral
Lucy Gray
The Idle Shepherd-Boys or Dungeon-Gill Force, a Pastoral
'Tis said that some have died for love, &c.
Poor Susan
Inscription for the Spot where the Hermitage Stood on St Herbert's Island, Derwent-Water
Inscription for the House (an Out-house) on the Island at Grasmere
To a Sexton
Andrew Jones
The Two Thieves, or the Last Stage of Avarice
A Whirl-blast from Behind the Hill, &c.
Song for the Wandering Jew
Ruth
Lines Written with a Slate-Pencil upon a Stone, &c.
Lines Written on a Tablet in a School
The Two April Mornings
The Fountain, a Conversation
Nutting
Three Years She Grew in Sun and Shower, &c.
The Pet-Lamb, a Pastoral
Written in Germany on One of the Coldest Days of the Century
The Childless Father
The Old Cumberland Beggar, a Description
Rural Architecture
A Poet's Epitaph
A Character
A Fragment
Poems on the Naming of Places
Michael, a Pastoral

For the 1800 edition Wordsworth added the poems that make up Volume II. The poem The Convict (Wordsworth) was in the 1798 edition, but Wordsworth omitted it from the 1800 edition, replacing it with Coleridge's "Love". Lewti or the Circassian Love-chaunt (Coleridge) exists in some 1798 editions in place of The Convict.
In the 1798 edition the poems later printed as "Lines Written When Sailing in a Boat at Evening" and "Lines Written Near Richmond, Upon the Thames" form a single poem, "Lines Written Near Richmond, Upon the Thames, at Evening".

References

External links

 
 
 
 
 
Lyrical Ballads – curated by Michigan State University professor
Lyrical Ballads available at Internet Archive
Preface to Lyrical Ballads 1802
Lyrical Ballads: A Scholarly Electronic Edition by Bruce Graver and Ron Tetreault

1798 poetry books
1800 poetry books
1802 poetry books
English poetry collections
Poetry anthologies
Works by Samuel Taylor Coleridge
Works by William Wordsworth